Abell 2390 is a galaxy cluster in the Abell catalogue.

See also
 Abell catalogue
 List of Abell clusters
 X-ray astronomy

References

2390
Galaxy clusters
Abell richness class 1
Pegasus (constellation)